Gabriel Johnston (1699 – 17 July 1752) was a British colonial official who served as the sixth governor of the Province of North Carolina from 1734 until his death in 1752. He was the longest serving governor, holding the office for 18 years.

Early life and career
Johnston was born in Scotland in 1699. He was a physician, political writer, and professor of Oriental languages at the University of St. Andrews.

Governor of North Carolina
Johnston was greatly disturbed by the conditions he found in the province and deplored what he considered the moral laxity, the disregard for law, the inadequate educational facilities, and the oppression of the poor. His administration witnessed an increase in wealth, population, and development of resources. 

The United Brethren purchased 100,000 acres of land and settled Wachovia. Another group emigrating in large numbers, and with especial appeal for the governor, were the Scots, who settled in the Cape Fear region. The union with England and a breakup in the clan system, as well as a pardon to all Scottish rebels who would emigrate, greatly stimulated their settlement in America. The General Assembly of North Carolina exempted all new settlers from taxation for ten years. The general assembly was probably motivated by a desire to increase immigration to the province, but doubtless the Scottish governor added weight to the measure.

Honors
Some years later the General Assembly of North Carolina provided for the erection of a fort on the south bank of Cape Fear and named it in honor of Johnston. Johnston County was also named after him.

References

1699 births
1752 deaths
18th-century Scottish medical doctors
18th-century Scottish writers
Academics of the University of St Andrews
Burials in North Carolina
Deaths in North Carolina
Governors of North-Carolina (1712–1776)
Johnston County, North Carolina
Scottish emigrants to the Thirteen Colonies